The Voisin Triplanes were large experimental bombers built by Voisin in 1915 and 1916. After unsuccessful trials of the 1915 prototype a modified version with more powerful engines was built in 1916, as the Voisin E.28, but the type did not enter production.

Design and development
The Voisin 1915 Triplane had an unorthodox configuration, the tail surfaces being supported between the fuselage and an upper boom attached to the centre section of the upper wing. The four engines were installed in tandem in two nacelles on the centre wing. Two gun positions were provided, one  the nose and  second behind the trailing edge of the wings, firing downwards through an aperture in the fuselage.
 
The first aircraft built was powered by four  engines but performance was unsatisfactory, and a second aircraft was built, designated E.28, powered by four  Hispano-Suiza engines, and a redesigned circular section fuselage.

Specifications (Voisin E.28)

References

External links

Voisin Triplan

Triplane
1910s French bomber aircraft
Four-engined push-pull aircraft
Triplanes
Military aircraft of World War I
Aircraft first flown in 1915